Edward Constantin Laufer (25 November 1938 – 7 May 2014) was a Canadian music theorist, composer and teacher.

Laufer was born in Zürich. His family emigrated to Canada in 1939, settling in Halifax. (He became a naturalized citizen in 1953.) Laufer obtained his bachelor of music degree from the University of Toronto in 1957 and his Masters of Music degree from the same institution in 1960. He studied composition with John Weinzweig, John Beckwith, Oskar Morawetz, and Tālivaldis Ķeniņš. Some time after 1960 he temporarily settled in the New York area, attending the Juilliard School where he studied piano with Eduard Steuermann and composition with Vincent Persichetti. At Princeton University, he studied composition with Milton Babbitt, Earl Kim, and Roger Sessions. While in the New York area, he studied Schenkerian analysis privately with Ernst Oster. Laufer obtained a Masters of Fine Arts from Princeton University in 1964.

Before returning to Canada, he taught at Smith College from 1969 to 1971, the State University of New York at Purchase from 1972 to 1974, and the Mannes College of Music from 1973 to 1974. Moving back to Toronto, he was composer-in-residence from 1974 to 1975 at the University of Toronto, and then became a member of its Faculty of Music.

He gave lectures in Canada, the United States, Finland, and England. He published articles in Perspectives of New Music, Journal of Music Theory, Music Theory Spectrum, and ''Intégral.

References

External links
 The Edward Laufer Electronic Archive (ELEA) at the University of North Texas

1938 births
2014 deaths
University of Toronto alumni
Juilliard School alumni
Princeton University alumni
20th-century Canadian composers
Canadian male composers
Academic staff of the University of Toronto
20th-century Canadian male musicians